Bardian may refer to:
 Bardian, Kohgiluyeh and Boyer-Ahmad
 Bardian, West Azerbaijan